Coxiella burnetii is an obligate intracellular bacterial pathogen, and is the causative agent of Q fever. The genus Coxiella is morphologically similar to Rickettsia, but with a variety of genetic and physiological differences. C. burnetii is a small Gram-negative, coccobacillary bacterium that is highly resistant to environmental stresses such as high temperature, osmotic pressure, and ultraviolet light. These characteristics are attributed to a small cell variant form of the organism that is part of a biphasic developmental cycle, including a more metabolically and replicatively active large cell variant form. It can survive standard disinfectants, and is resistant to many other environmental changes like those presented in the phagolysosome.

History and naming
Research in the 1920s and 1930s identified what appeared to be a new type of Rickettsia, isolated from ticks, that was able to pass through filters. The first description of what may have been Coxiella burnetii was published in 1925 by Hideyo Noguchi, but since his samples did not survive, it remains unclear as to whether it was the same organism. The definitive descriptions were published in the late 1930s as part of research into the cause of Q fever, by Edward Holbrook Derrick and Macfarlane Burnet in Australia, and Herald Rea Cox and Gordon Davis at the Rocky Mountain Laboratory (RML) in the United States.

The RML team proposed the name Rickettsia diaporica, derived from the Greek word for having the ability to pass through filter pores, to avoid naming it after either Cox or Davis if indeed Noguchi's description had priority. Around the same time, Derrick proposed the name Rickettsia burnetii, in recognition of Burnet's contribution in identifying the organism as a Rickettsia. As it became clear that the species differed significantly from other Rickettsia, it was first elevated to a subgenus named after Cox, Coxiella, and then in 1948 to its own genus of that name, proposed by Cornelius B. Philip, another RML researcher. Research in the 1960s1970s by French Canadian-American microbiologist and virologist Paul Fiset was instrumental in the development of the first successful Q fever vaccine.

Coxiella was difficult to study because it could not be reproduced outside a host. However, in 2009, scientists reported a technique allowing the bacteria to grow in an axenic culture and suggested the technique may be useful for study of other pathogens.

Pathogenesis

The ID50 (the dose needed to infect 50% of experimental subjects) is one via inhalation; i.e., inhalation of one organism will yield disease in 50% of the population. This is an extremely low infectious dose (only 1-10 organisms required), making C. burnetii one of the most infectious known organisms. Disease occurs in two stages: an acute stage that presents with headaches, chills, and respiratory symptoms, and an insidious chronic stage.

While most infections clear up spontaneously, treatment with tetracycline or doxycycline appears to reduce the symptomatic duration and reduce the likelihood of chronic infection. A combination of erythromycin and rifampin is highly effective in curing the disease, and vaccination with Q-VAX vaccine (CSL) is effective for prevention of it.

The bacteria use a type IVB secretion system known as Icm/Dot (intracellular multiplication / defect in organelle trafficking genes) to inject over 100 effector proteins into the host. These effectors increase the bacteria's ability to survive and grow inside the host cell by modulating many host cell pathways, including blocking cell death, inhibiting immune reactions, and altering vesicle trafficking. In Legionella pneumophila, which uses the same secretion system and also injects effectors, survival is enhanced because these proteins interfere with fusion of the bacteria-containing vacuole with the host's degradation endosomes.

Use as a biological weapon
The United States ended its biological warfare program in 1969. When it did, C. burnetii was one of seven agents it had standardized as biological weapons.

Genomics
At least ten completely sequenced genomes of Coxiella burnetii strains exist, which contain about 2.1 Mbp of DNA each and encode around 2,100 open reading frames; 746 (or about 35%) of these genes have no known function.

In bacteria small regulatory RNAs are activated during stress and virulence conditions. Coxiella burnetii small RNAs (CbSRs 1, 11, 12, and 14) are encoded within intergenic region (IGR). CbSRs 2, 3, 4 and 9 are located antisense to identified ORFs. The CbSRs are up-regulated during intracellular growth in host cells.

Additional images

References

External links 
 Coxiella burnetii genomes and related information at PATRIC, a Bioinformatics Resource Center funded by NIAID

Legionellales
Biological weapons
Gram-negative bacteria
Bacteria described in 1939